The Canadian Hockey Association (CHA)  was an early men's professional ice hockey league. It was founded in November, 1909, as the result of a dispute within the Eastern Canada Hockey Association. The CHA survived only a few weeks of play in January 1910 before two teams jumped to the new National Hockey Association (NHA), itself a seven-week-old league, causing dissolution of the CHA.

The CHA held the Stanley Cup for its entire eight week existence, as the reigning champion Ottawa Hockey Club was a founding member.

History

At the regular annual meeting of the Eastern Canada Hockey Association, held at the Windsor Hotel in Montreal on November 25, 1909, three teams from the ECHA (Ottawa, Quebec, and the Montreal Shamrocks) resigned and formed the new Canadian Hockey Association. The new league then took applications from other teams including their former partner the Montreal Wanderers of the ECHA. The three teams had decided to form the new league after the Wanderers were sold to new owners that wanted to move the club to the smaller Jubilee Arena from their former home, the Montreal Arena. The other clubs, most specifically Ottawa, then the Stanley Cup champions, wanted to only play at the Montreal Arena. The CHA then opened their association to applications from other hockey clubs, rejecting applications from Wanderers which did not commit to the Arena, while accepting two other teams: the All-Montreal, organized by former Wanderers captain Art Ross, and the francophone Montreal Le National.

Play started on December 30. After a few games it was clear that fan interest was not there as only 800 fans were recorded for the game between the Nationals and the Shamrocks. After the January 8 game between All-Montreal and Ottawa, which was attended by only 1500 fans, Art Ross made plans to suspend the All-Montreal team and, along with Paddy Moran, join the Haileybury team of the NHA. League secretary Emmett Quinn notified the Ottawa team that the situation was hopeless. The Shamrocks announced that they would abandon the league. The CHA owners decided to proceed with an amalgamation with the NHA, entitling the league the "Canadian-National Hockey League".

A meeting with the NHA on January 15, 1910 was planned to consider amalgamation with the CHA, but amalgamation was not discussed. Instead the NHA admitted Ottawa, Quebec, and the Shamrocks. The Le National were offered the franchise of Les Canadiens, but declined, partly due to the Canadiens' lease with the Jubilee Arena. No invitation was offered to All-Montreal and Quebec. The CHA ceased operations.

During its brief season, the Ottawa Hockey Club won a Stanley Cup challenge against Galt HC, champions of the Ontario Professional Hockey League (OPHL). For this, and a challenge during the NHA season, the Senators are considered co-champions of the Stanley Cup in 1910.

Final standing

Season summary

† This game, a scheduled CHA game, was counted in the NHA schedule.

Stanley Cup Challenges

During the CHA season, Ottawa as Cup champion played one challenge in addition to their regular schedule:

Ottawa vs. Galt

Ottawa played a two-game total goals series against Galt HC, champions of the Ontario Professional Hockey League and prevailed with 12–3 and 3–1 victories. Marty Walsh led Ottawa with 6 goals. Jim Mallen, older brother of Ottawa's Ken Mallen played for Galt.

Stanley Cup engraving
The 1910 Stanley Cup was presented by the trophy's trustee William Foran.

The following Ottawa Hockey Club players and staff were members of the Stanley Cup winning team.

1910 Ottawa Hockey Club Senators

See also
 Hockey Canada
 List of Stanley Cup champions
 List of pre-NHL seasons
 List of ice hockey leagues

References

General

Defunct ice hockey leagues in Canada
Pre–National Hockey League
1909–10 in Canadian ice hockey by league